WPGX (channel 28) is a television station in Panama City, Florida, United States, affiliated with the Fox network. The station is owned by Lockwood Broadcast Group, and maintains transmitter facilities on Blue Springs Road in unincorporated Youngstown, Bay County. Its studios are located on West 23rd Street/SR 368 in Panama City, though most of its on-air master control operations originate from Gray Television's WBRC in Birmingham, Alabama, its former sister Fox affiliate until the start of 2019.

History
The station, originally owned by Family Group Broadcasting, began operations on May 1, 1988, and aired an analog signal on UHF channel 28. Its previous owner, Waitt Media, sold WPGX to Raycom Media in 2003. At one point under Raycom ownership, WPGX previously maintained its facilities in Panama City on Luverne Avenue in a building (known as the "Fox Television Center") shared with a Suntrust Bank branch. In May 2010, it launched a website for the first time under Raycom's control. It mainly serves as an advertorial web address with various promotions from Panama City businesses and has limited station-related content, including FCC public file and EEO disclosures.

Atlanta-based Gray Television announced its acquisition of Raycom on June 25, 2018; Gray immediately put WPGX on the market, as it already owned WJHG-TV (channel 7). On August 20, 2018, Gray announced that WPGX, along with fellow Fox affiliates WTNZ in Knoxville, Tennessee, WFXG in Augusta, Georgia, and WDFX-TV in Dothan, Alabama, would be sold to Lockwood Broadcast Group. The sale was completed on January 2, 2019.

Programming
Syndicated programming on the station includes TMZ on TV, Two and a Half Men, The Big Bang Theory, and Judge Judy among others.

WPGX broadcasts a local hour block of programming weekday mornings at 6:30, The Panhandle Outdoor Show and Ask the Master Auto Technician. The former is hosted by outdoorsman Winston Chester, with the latter produced by the James Auto Center and carrying car care tips and other topics of interest to the host, James Morris.

News operation
At one time in the 1990s, WJHG produced a 9 p.m. newscast for WPGX. This was very short-lived, and Panama City was one of the few places in the country (and a very select group of Fox affiliates) not to have a prime time newscast of any kind.

In January 2010, local ABC outlet WMBB (then owned by Hoak Media) began producing local weather cut-ins for this station (recorded in advance) through an arrangement. Although there was speculation this agreement would eventually be expanded into a prime time newscast at 9, these plans never came to fruition at the time. The weather segments ceased airing at some point and this Fox affiliate resumed taped weather forecasts produced by WeatherVision, which had produced them before the arrangement with WMBB was made.

On June 1, 2020, WPGX debuted an hour-long weeknight 9 p.m. newscast produced by WMBB, titled Fox 28 News at 9:00. This happened alongside fellow sister station WDFX in Dothan terminating their existing arrangement with former sister station WSFA. Like in Panama City, Lockwood contracted with Nexstar-owned WDHN to produce a locally-based 9 p.m. newscast in Dothan.

Technical information

Subchannels
The station's digital signal is multiplexed:

WPGX-DT2 was a charter affiliate of The Tube Music Network before its ended operations in October 2007. The subchannel was relaunched in 2013 to carry Bounce TV, with Grit joining WPGX on its third subchannel in September 2014 and Court TV joining WPGX on its fourth subchannel in May 2019.

Analog-to-digital conversion
WPGX shut down its analog signal, over UHF channel 28, on June 12, 2009, the official date in which full-power television stations in the United States transitioned from analog to digital broadcasts under federal mandate. The station's digital signal remained on its pre-transition VHF channel 9. Through the use of PSIP, digital television receivers display the station's virtual channel as its former UHF analog channel 28.

References

External links

Television channels and stations established in 1988
PGX
Fox network affiliates
Bounce TV affiliates
Grit (TV network) affiliates
Lockwood Broadcast Group
1988 establishments in Florida